Michael Hauschild (born January 22, 1990) is an American professional baseball pitcher who is a free agent. He has played in Major League Baseball (MLB) for the Toronto Blue Jays and Texas Rangers.

Amateur career
Hauschild attended Beavercreek High School in Beavercreek, Ohio, and played college baseball at the University of Dayton. In 2011, he played collegiate summer baseball with the Orleans Firebirds of the Cape Cod Baseball League.

Professional career

Houston Astros
Hauschild was drafted by the Houston Astros in the 33rd round of the 2012 Major League Baseball Draft. He made his professional debut for the rookie ball Greeneville Astros. He split the 2013 season between the Single-A Quad Cities River Bandits and the High-A Lancaster JetHawks, pitching to a cumulative 9-4 record and 3.50 ERA in 28 appearances. He split 2014 between Lancaster and the Double-A Corpus Christi Hooks, recording a 4-10 record and 4.32 ERA in 133.1 innings pitched. In 2015, Hauschild reached Triple-A for the first time, splitting the season between the Fresno Grizzlies and Corpus Christi. On the year, he registered a 12-6 record and 3.38 ERA in 138.1 innings of work. He spent all of 2016 in Fresno, pitching to a 9-10 record and 3.22 ERA in 24 games.

Texas Rangers
He was selected by the Texas Rangers in the 2016 Rule 5 draft. Hauschild made the Rangers' Opening Day roster in 2017. Hauschild allowed 10 runs in 8.0 innings in 4 appearances for Texas. On April 20, 2017, Hauschild was designated for assignment by the Rangers.

Houston Astros (second stint)
He was returned to the Houston Astros on April 22, 2017. Hauschild spent the remainder of the season in Fresno, recording a 4.58 ERA in 18 games. He was invited to Spring Training with the Astros for the 2018 season but did not make the club and was assigned to Fresno to start the year. On July 30, 2018, the Astros released Hauschild.

Toronto Blue Jays
On August 2, 2018, Hauschild signed with the Toronto Blue Jays. On September 4, Hauschild was designated for assignment after allowing 4 runs in 8.1 innings of work. He elected free agency on October 2.

St. Louis Cardinals
On November 15, 2018, Hauschild signed a minor league deal with the St. Louis Cardinals. He was released on July 30, 2019.

Sugar Land Skeeters
On August 4, 2019, Hauschild signed with the Sugar Land Skeeters of the Atlantic League of Professional Baseball. He became a free agent following the season. 

On February 25, 2020, Hauschild signed with the Generales de Durango of the Mexican League. Hauschild did not play in a game in 2020 due to the cancellation of the Mexican League season because of the COVID-19 pandemic.

Lexington Legends
On May 4, 2021, Hauschild signed with the Lexington Legends of the Atlantic League of Professional Baseball. In 3 games for the Legends, Hauschild recorded a 1-2 record and 3.68 ERA.

Chicago Cubs
On June 10, 2021, Hauschild's contract was purchased by the Chicago Cubs organization. On November 7, 2021, Hauschild elected free agency.

References

External links

1990 births
Living people
American expatriate baseball players in Canada
Baseball players from Dayton, Ohio
Buffalo Bisons (minor league) players
Corpus Christi Hooks players
Dayton Flyers baseball players
Fresno Grizzlies players
Greeneville Astros players
Lancaster JetHawks players
Leones del Escogido players
American expatriate baseball players in the Dominican Republic
Lexington Legends players
Major League Baseball pitchers
Memphis Redbirds players
Orleans Firebirds players
Quad Cities River Bandits players
Sugar Land Skeeters players
Texas Rangers players
Toronto Blue Jays players